Amethyst is the fourth mixtape and fifth overall project by American singer Tinashe, released on March 16, 2015. The mixtape, named for her birthstone, follows the release of her debut album Aquarius (2014). Tinashe wrote and recorded the mixtape in her bedroom over the 2014 Christmas vacation and released it as a "thank you" to her fans.

Critical reception

Amethyst received generally positive reviews, with Pitchfork saying that "it reminds us that Tinashe has come to seem like a uniquely genuine presence in R&B". Jezebel also wrote a very positive review on the mixtape, describing the mixtape as "there's an ease and intellect, a fortitude and freedom".

The mixtape was later named one of  Complex' '15 Mixtapes That Should Have Won Grammys', stating that " Amethyst was one of 2015's strongest coming-of-age R&B projects, second only to Bieber if we expand that distinction to include pop". Complex magazine listed the album at number 24 of the best albums of 2015.

Track listing
Credits adapted from BMI.

References

2015 mixtape albums
Tinashe albums